Carabus blaptoides blaptoides is a subspecies of ground beetle from family Carabidae that is endemic to Japan.

References

blaptoides blaptoides
Beetles described in 1836